The Vellone–Sacro Monte funicular is a funicular railway in the town of Varese in the Italian region of Lombardy.

The line first opened in May 1909, and remained in service until August 1953. Service was first reinstated in July 2000, before being suspended in 2003 and reinstated in 2005. It shared its lower station with the  until both lines closed in 1953. The Campo dei Fiori line never reopened.

The funicular is operated by the Azienda Varesina Trasporti, and has the following technical parameters:

See also 
 List of funicular railways

References

External links
 
  Web site of the Azienda Varesina Trasporti, with information on the funicular

Funicular railways in Italy
Metre gauge railways in Italy
Railway lines opened in 1909
Railway lines in Lombardy